"No Love" is a 2010 song by Eminem

No Love may also refer to:

No Love (film), a 1991 Soviet drama directed by Valery Rubinchik
"No Love" (Summer Walker and SZA song), a song by Summer Walker and SZA, 2021
"No Love" (Lucky J song), 2016
"No Love" (Joan Armatrading song), 1981
"No Love (I'm Not Used to)", a song by Kevon Edmonds, 1999
"No Love", a song by August Alsina from Testimony, 2014
"No Love", a song by Death Grips from No Love Deep Web, 2012
"No Love", a song by the Get Up Kids from Four Minute Mile, 1997
"No Love", a song by Kevin Gates from By Any Means 2, 2017
"No Love", a song by Lil Scrappy, 2012
"No Love", a song by HIM from the album Tears on Tape, 2013
"No Love", a song by Noriel, 2018
"No Love", a song by Olivia O'Brien, 2017
"No Love", a song by Simple Plan from Simple Plan, 2008
"No Love", a song by Young M.A from Herstory in the Making, 2019
"(I Guess There's) No Love", a song by Mable John, 1961